Phavaraea dilatata is a moth of the  family Notodontidae. It is found in South America, from French Guiana to southeastern Brazil.

External links
Species page at Tree of Life project

Notodontidae of South America
Moths described in 1854